The Joseph M. Farley Nuclear Generating Plant is located near Dothan, Alabama in the southern United States.

History 
The plant is named after the late Joseph McConnell Farley, an American attorney born in Birmingham, Alabama who became president of Alabama Power (owner of the facility) from 1969 to 1989 and was later CEO of Southern Nuclear Operating Company; both companies are subsidiaries of Southern Company.

Construction of the plant began in 1970. Fluor Corporation of Irving, Texas was the general contractor. Unit 1 achieved commercial operation in December 1977. Unit 2 began commercial operation in July 1981. The total cost of the plant was about $1.57 billion. On May 12, 2005, the Nuclear Regulatory Commission (NRC) approved license renewal applications for both reactors at the site.  Unit 1's extended operating license is set to expire on June 25, 2037 and Unit 2's on March 31, 2041.

Technology 
This plant has two Westinghouse reactors.
Unit 1:  2,821 MWt
Unit 2:  2,821 MWt
Both units are three-loop pressurized water reactors.  The facility is cooled using six mechanical draft cooling towers supplied by water from the Chattahoochee River.

Electricity Production

Ownership 
Farley, Unit 1
Owner = Alabama Power Company (100 percent). 
Operator (Licensee) = Southern Nuclear Operation Company. 
Farley, Unit 2
Owner = Alabama Power Company (100 percent). 
Operator (Licensee) = Southern Nuclear Operation Company.

Surrounding population

The 2010 U.S. population within  of Farley was 11,842, an increase of 8.0 percent in a decade, according to an analysis of U.S. Census data for msnbc.com. The 2010 U.S. population within  was 421,374, an increase of 6.1 percent since 2000. Cities within 50 miles include Dothan (17 miles to city center).

Seismic risk
The NRC's estimate of the risk each year of an earthquake intense enough to cause core damage to the reactor at Farley was 1 in 35,714, according to an NRC study published in August 2010.

References

External links

  

Energy infrastructure completed in 1977
Energy infrastructure completed in 1981
Buildings and structures in Houston County, Alabama
Alabama Power
Nuclear power plants in Alabama
Nuclear power stations using pressurized water reactors
1977 establishments in Alabama